Cannankara Velayudhan Raman Pillai (19 May 1858 – 21 March 1922), also known as C. V., was one of the major Indian novelists and playwrights and a pioneering playwright and novelist of Malayalam literature. He was known for his historical novels such as Marthandavarma, Dharmaraja and Ramaraja Bahadur; the last mentioned considered by many as one of the greatest novels written in Malayalam.

Biography 

Born in Thiruvananthapuram (Trivandrum), capital city of Travancore, on 19 May 1858 to Panavilakath Neelakanta Pillai, a Sanskrit scholar and Parvathy Pillai, a scion of an ancient matrilineal family; both his parents were from middle-class families and employees at the Palace of the Maharaja of Travancore. Pillai got his family name, Cannankara, through matrilineal succession. Fondly called Ramu, he had a traditional Sanskritized education, early in life, under his father's tutelage which included lessons in Ayurveda and even magic and Tantra. He continued education at the first English school in Thiruvananthapuram. Subsequently, he graduated from His Highness Maharaja's College (the present-day University College Thiruvananthapuram), the first-ever College in Travancore, where he reportedly had a brilliant academic career under John Ross, the principal of the institution  and Robert Harvey. and obtained his BA degree from the Madras University in 1881, securing the 7th rank in the Madras Presidency. It was during this period, he started his first periodical named The Kerala Patriot.

After graduation, Pillai studied law but dropped out and went to  Madras to study for the government pleader examination which was also abandoned in due course. Later, he joined the High Court as a clerk and where he rose to the position of a shirasthadar. Later, joined the Government Press and held the position of a superintendent when he retired from service. In between, he founded three publications, Malayali in 1886, Vanchiraj in 1901 and Mitabhashi in 1920.

Pillai's first marriage did not last long. He married again in 1887 at the age of 30, and his wife, Bhageerathi Amma, was only 16 at the time of the wedding. The marriage lasted till his wife's untimely death in 1904 and his third marriage was to Janaki Amma, the elder sister of Bhageerathi Amma and the widow of C. Raja Raja Varma, the younger brother of Raja Ravi Varma. He died on 21 March 1922, at the age of 63, survived by Janaki Amma.

Writing career

Raman Pillai is compared by many with Bankim Chandra Chatterjee in Bengali and Hari Narayan Apte in Marathi, two other greats of India literature. His first published book was Chandramukhivilasam, a satire. He wrote his first novel, Marthandavarma, in 1885 but it was published in 1891. This followed sch historical novels as Dharmaraja and Ramarajabahadur, the social novel, Premamritam as well as several farces. Modern Malayalam drama traces its origins to his works. He is credited with the first original play in Malayalam,  Chandramukheevilasam, written in 1884 and was staged for four days successively in 1887 at His Highness Maharaja's College, Trivandrum.

Exegetic dictionary
C. V. Vyaakhyaana Kosham is a 400-plus page lexicographic work in four volumes, based on Pillai's books. The work includes the explanations, elucidations and interpretations of over 700,000 Malayalam, Sanskrit, Tamil, Hindustani and English words used by him in his writings.

Works

Novels

Historical Novels
 Marthandavarma (1891)
 Dharmaraja (1913)
 Ramaraja Bahadur (19181919)

Social Novels
 Premamritam (1915)

Uncategorized
 Dishtadamshtram (1922) (unfinished)
 Premarishtam (1922) (unfinished)

Plays
 Chandramukheevilāsam (1884) (not published)
 Mattavilāsam (1885) (not published)
 Kurupillakalari (1909)
 Tentanāmkōţţu Harischandran (1914)
 Kaimalassanţe Kadassikkai (1915)
 Docţarku Kiţţiya Micham (1916)
 Cherutēn Columbus (1917)
 Pandathē Pāchan (1918)
 Pãpi Chelluņadam Pāthālam (1919)
 Kuruppinţe Thirippu (1920)
 Butler Pappan (1922)

Other works
 Videsiyamedhavitvam (1922) (a collection of editorials)

As editor in newspapers
 The Kerala Patriot (1883)
 Malayali (1886)
 Vanchiraj (1901)
 Mitabhashi (1920)

Translations
 Marthandavarma (1936, 1979)
 Dharmaraja (2009)
 Ramaraja Bahadur (2003)

Honours
The India Post issued a commemorative postage stamp on Pillai on 19 May 2010. A road in Vazhuthacaud, Thiruvananthapuram has been neamed after him as C. V. Raman Pillai Road. Chenkal, a panchayat in Thiruvananthapuram which includes his native village of Arayoor, was renamed as C.V.R. Puram in 1970.

Writings on Raman Pillai 
 
 
 
 
 
 K. Ayyappa Paniker, History of Malayalam Literature (C. V. Raman Pillai - Chapter 34)
 N. Balakrishnan Nair, Saakshaal C. V.

See also
 Kappazhom Raman Pillai
 Thunchath Ezhuthachan Malayalam University

See Also (Social reformers of Kerala) 

 Sree Narayana Guru
 Dr. Palpu
 Kumaranasan
 Rao Sahib Dr. Ayyathan Gopalan
 Brahmananda Swami Sivayogi
 Vaghbhatananda
 Mithavaadi Krishnan
 Moorkoth Kumaran
 Ayyankali
 Ayya Vaikundar
 Pandit Karuppan

References

External links
 
 

Malayalam-language writers
Malayalam novelists
Malayalam-language dramatists and playwrights
1858 births
1922 deaths
Writers from Thiruvananthapuram
Indian historical novelists
Writers of historical romances
19th-century Indian novelists
20th-century Indian novelists
Indian male novelists
Indian male dramatists and playwrights
20th-century Indian dramatists and playwrights
19th-century Indian dramatists and playwrights
19th-century Indian male writers
Novelists from Kerala
Journalists from Kerala
19th-century Indian journalists
20th-century Indian journalists
Dramatists and playwrights from Kerala
20th-century Indian male writers